The 2010–11 Midland Football Combination season was the 74th in the history of Midland Football Combination, a football competition in England.

Premier Division

The Premier Division featured 18 clubs which competed in the division last season, along with one new club, promoted from Division One:
Alveston

League table

References

2010-11
10